Daniel L. Hannifin (June 12, 1863 in Portland, Dodge County, Wisconsin – ?), was a member of the Wisconsin State Assembly. He graduated from high school in Waterloo, Wisconsin. For twelve years he was employed at a teaching school, and was also a farmer. He served as bookkeeper and secretary of the Waterloo Canning and Pickeling Company, and was the town clerk of Portland, Wisconsin.

Career
Hannifin was elected to the Assembly in 1902. Additionally, he served as Clerk of Portland. He was a Democrat.

References

See also
The Political Graveyard

People from Portland, Dodge County, Wisconsin
People from Waterloo, Wisconsin
Democratic Party members of the Wisconsin State Assembly
1863 births
Year of death missing